The Shire of Corrigin is a local government area in the Wheatbelt region of Western Australia, about  east of the state capital, Perth. Its seat of government is the town of Corrigin.

History
From 1891 until 1913, different parts of the area was managed by Morambine (Pingelly), Greenhills and Brookton Road Boards. On 14 February 1913, after the announcement of a proposed railway from Brookton on the Great Southern Railway to terminate in the town of Kunjin, the Kunjinn Road District was gazetted. The first Road Board members held their meetings in a small timber and iron building with their first ever purchase being a billy, tea and sugar. After only three meetings, it was decided to shift the meeting venue to the new townsite of Corrigin as Kunjin was no longer under consideration as the major rail junction. Accordingly, in 1914, the district was renamed the Corrigin Road District. On 1 July 1961, it became a Shire under the Local Government Act 1960, which reformed all remaining road districts into shires.

Wards
The first ward system, established in 1914, divided the road district into the Wogerlin, Kurren-Kutten, Bullaring, Central, Dondakin and Kunjinn Wards. The first two of these were abolished in 1988 and replaced with the Bilbarin Ward, and the Central Ward gradually increased in importance, reaching a peak of 5 of the 11 councillors then in place between 1992 and 1999.

From 1 May 1999 until 19 October 2007, the Shire was divided into three wards, each electing three councillors:

 North Ward
 Central Ward
 South Ward

As of 20 October 2007, the council is undivided and all nine councillors represent the entire Shire.

Towns and localities
The towns and localities of the Shire of Corrigin with population and size figures based on the most recent Australian census:

Population

Notable councillors
 Brendon Grylls, Shire of Corrigin councillor 2000–2001; later a state MP

Heritage-listed places

As of 2023, 197 places are heritage-listed in the Shire of Corrigin, of which four are on the State Register of Heritage Places.

References

External links
 

Corrigin